Syntypistis pryeri is a species of moth of the family Notodontidae first described by John Henry Leech in 1889. It is found in China (Zhejiang, Fujian, Hubei, Hunan, Guangxi, Sichuan, Yunnan, Shaanxi, Gansu), Taiwan, Korea and Japan.

References

Moths described in 1889
Notodontidae
Moths of Japan